Ronald Serugo (born 5 September 1984) is an Ugandan amateur boxer who qualified for the 2008 Summer Olympics in the junior flyweight division. He defeated Tresford Kaziwa, then lost to Redouane Bouchtouk 0:11 before winning the third spot by defeating South African Lobogang Pilane. At the Olympics he lost 5:9 to Pürevdorjiin Serdamba.

Serugo Ronald won bronze medal in the All Africa Games 2011. After defeating utoni Jafet of Namibia in the semi finals.
Won a gold medal in the Tammer international tournament in flyweight category 2011 in Finland.

Serugo returned to the Olympics in the 2016 Men's flyweight competition, losing a 2-1 decision to Armenia's Narek Abgaryan in the opening round.

External links
Qualifier
Ronald Serugo's profile at ESPN Sports
 "New talent emerges in Tampere, Finland", AIBA

1984 births
Living people
Light-flyweight boxers
Olympic boxers of Uganda
Boxers at the 2008 Summer Olympics
Boxers at the 2016 Summer Olympics
Ugandan male boxers
African Games medalists in boxing
Competitors at the 2011 All-Africa Games
African Games bronze medalists for Uganda